Serbian police may refer to:

 Police of the Republic of Serbia
 Police of Republika Srpska